Mount Elliot may refer to:

 Mount Elliot, New South Wales, Australia
 Mount Elliot, Queensland, Australia
 Mount Elliot (Antarctica)

See also
 Mount Elliott (disambiguation)